The Boulevard Mall is located at 3528 S Maryland Pkwy, in Paradise, Nevada, United States (an unincorporated town in the Las Vegas Valley). It has 140 stores; anchor stores include Goodwill and 99 Ranch Market. It is the oldest shopping mall in the Las Vegas Valley.

Initially announced as the Parkway Mall in September 1963, it opened as The Boulevard Mall on March 6, 1968, as the state's first enclosed, climate-controlled shopping mall. It contained 26 stores and four department stores upon opening. It became one of the top shopping spots in the Las Vegas Valley, and was popular among tourists because of its close proximity to the Las Vegas Strip. Customer attendance decreased after the opening of the nearby Fashion Show Mall in 1981. The Boulevard Mall was renovated in 1984. An expansion and further renovations began in 1990 and were completed in 1992, at a cost of $60 million. It was the largest mall in southern Nevada until 2003.

Beginning in 2008, the mall was affected by a decrease in customer attendance due to the Great Recession. By early 2012, it experienced increased customer visitations after introducing several Hispanic community organizations as tenants, in response to the growing nearby Hispanic community. Sansone Companies purchased the mall in November 2013, at a cost of $54.5 million, and then launched a $25 million overhaul which included several unique tenants not usually associated with malls. Macy's and JCPenney closed in 2017, followed by Sears in 2019.

History

Construction
The Boulevard Mall was initially announced as the Parkway Mall on September 27, 1963. A total of 6,000 parking spaces was also planned. The project's developer would be the Las Vegas-based Parkway Investment Company, a subsidiary of Paradise Homes. Individuals involved in the project included partners Harry Lahr, Irwin Molasky, and Merv Adelson.

After the mall's announcement, it was announced that Sears, Roebuck and Co. would build their own store at the mall's northern end. In December 1963, Broadway-Hale Stores, Inc. announced plans to build an $8 million department store at the mall's southern end. The three-story Broadway store was to be designed by the Los Angeles-based Charles Luckman and Associates, and was to include , including a restaurant and a tire service center. The store was expected to employ approximately 300 people, and was expected to be open by fall 1965. Groundbreaking for the Sears, Roebuck and Co. store began on June 30, 1964.

Construction of the mall began in 1965. The mall was designed by Texas architects Robert R. Weber and Associates. Construction of the Broadway's three-floor  store began in October 1965. The Sears store was completed in December 1965, and opened shortly thereafter as the mall's first department store. By 1966, the mall was known as the Boulevard Shopping Center, with the Dallas-based Haas and Hayne Investment Corporation as the owner and developer.

On April 29, 1966, a 100-year time capsule was buried at the entrance of the Broadway store (eventually a Macy's store), with plans to open it on April 29, 2066. Nevada governor Grant Sawyer and lieutenant governor Paul Laxalt attended the time capsule ceremony along with city and county officials. KLAS-TV, a local news channel, was also present to film the ceremony. Items placed in the capsule included the Nevada state flag, copies of the Las Vegas Sun and Las Vegas Review-Journal, and KLAS' film coverage of the ceremony. The Broadway store was expected to open on October 31, 1966, while the mall was expected to be finished in spring 1967. Like Sears, The Broadway also began operations ahead of the mall's opening. The mall cost a total of $12.5 million to construct.

Opening and operation (1968–2013)
The Boulevard Mall opened at 10:00 a.m. on March 6, 1968, with a ribbon-cutting ceremony attended by Nevada governor Paul Laxalt and Nevada state senator Floyd Lamb. The Boulevard was the first enclosed, climate-controlled shopping mall to open in Nevada. The mall's theme at that time was meant to resemble a European village. Its signature entrance was designed by John Graham Jr., who had also designed the Space Needle tower in Seattle, Washington.

The mall was popular among tourists because of its close proximity to the Las Vegas Strip, located approximately a mile and a half west of the mall. The Boulevard Mall became one of the top shopping spots in the Las Vegas Valley, resulting in Maryland Parkway becoming a popular retail corridor. The mall was financially successful during the 1970s, but experienced a loss in customers after the 1981 opening of the nearby Fashion Show Mall on the Las Vegas Strip. The mall would further be affected by other retail centers on the Strip, as well as the Galleria at Sunset mall in nearby Henderson, Nevada.

The Boulevard Mall was remodeled in 1984. A major expansion and renovation began in October 1990, and was completed in August 1992, at a cost of $60 million. It included the opening of a fourth new anchor store Dillard's. A surveillance system was also installed throughout the mall, and included 140 cameras, as well as horseback and bicycle security, and a security podium.

By April 1998, the mall encompassed , and was owned by Dallas-based MEPC American Properties. General Growth Properties (GGP) purchased the mall that month. It kept the title of "The Largest Mall in Southern Nevada" until the Fashion Show Mall's renovation in 2003. In May 2004, renovation plans were announced for the mall. Among the planned changes was the addition of a pedestrian shopping and restaurant streetscape. Interior changes would include a children's play area, new landscaping, new seating, new tile flooring, a remodeled food court, refurbished bathrooms, and the addition of a family bathroom. Two new entrances were also planned: one on the mall's west side, near a parking garage, and another on the mall's east side, near Dillard's. The mall was scheduled to remain open during the renovations, with construction expected to begin in summer 2004 for completion in fall 2005.

The mall suffered from the effects of the Great Recession, with various store closings beginning in 2008. By 2011, the five-mile radius surrounding the mall had a Hispanic population of 45 percent, as well as a sizeable Filipino population; both groups became the mall's target clientele. Rouse Properties, a corporate spin-off of GGP formed in August 2011, took over ownership and operations of the mall in January 2012. Rouse Properties continued the strategy of appealing to the Hispanic and Filipino population.

2013 sale and renovations

As of late 2012, the mall was 89-percent leased out, although only 73 percent of the mall was occupied by tenants, as several had closed due to poor economic conditions. The Boulevard Mall had the second lowest occupancy rate of Rouse Properties' 32 malls, located across 20 states. The mall also had $168 million in debt from a loan, prompting Rouse Properties to surrender the mall to foreclosure in June 2013. The mall was acquired by Midland Loan Services, related to PNC Bank. The mall was valued at $61.2 million, and contained . In July 2013, the lenders put the mall up for sale, with "best offer" as the listed price. On November 21, 2013, the mall was sold for $54.5 million to Sansone Companies, a long-time Las Vegas real estate firm owned by local developer Roland Sansone. The sale was announced 11 days later. Sansone purchased 56 of the mall's 75 acres; the remaining acreage was owned by the Macy's and Sears stores. The newly formed Sansone Companies/Boulevard Ventures LLC planned to keep current tenants and add new ones. Boulevard Ventures LLC owns 56.15 percent of the mall, while 2495 Riviera LP has 43.85 percent ownership.

The Boulevard Mall is the oldest shopping mall in the Las Vegas Valley. By the time of the purchase, the mall was considered to be dated and run down. Sansone wanted to begin various renovations and sign up new tenants by summer 2014, with plans to conclude his overhaul of the mall in spring 2015. Sansone planned to add unique tenants that were not usually associated with malls. Among the new tenants that Sansone wanted were restaurants, a bowling alley, a miniature golf course, a movie theater, and a Hispanic/Filipino supermarket. The first phase of renovations would include building repairs and the addition of drought-tolerant landscaping. The mall's gray colors would also be replaced with new paint. Other phases included the addition of a farmers' market and Wi-Fi in the food court, which would also be renovated to include four 80-inch televisions. The 70-tenant farmers market would be located outside the mall's main entrance on Maryland Parkway, and would include a large play area for children. New valet drop-off and pick-up areas were also planned. The mall would remain open during the renovations. Sansone's target clientele was working-class people.

Sansone launched his overhaul with a planned cost of $25 million. Restaurant construction was underway inside the mall in March 2015. At the time, general manager Timo Kuusela said about the mall, "Ten years ago, it was basically just packed with people all the time, and we had a lot more national tenants. It made money with no effort. Today, we really have to work to meet the needs of the demographic we serve." Extensive exterior renovations were underway in April 2015, resulting in an Art Deco façade. The mall was 85-percent leased at the time, compared to 75-percent a few years earlier.

As of September 2016, tenant occupancy was around 95 percent. Later that year, Las Vegas Weekly wrote that the Boulevard Mall may be the "most charming shopping center" in Las Vegas. In May 2018, a masked man entered the mall with a rifle, prompting an evacuation of the property. The man was apprehended by police, who believed the gun to be fake.

Tenants
The mall featured four department stores: The Broadway; JCPenney; Sears, Roebuck and Co.; and Ronzone's, which was Nevada's largest family-owned merchandise retailer at the time of the mall's opening. Ronzone's was later acquired by Diamond's, which expanded the  store inside the mall. Dillard's later acquired the Diamond's store location, before eventually opening a new  Dillard's department store in the mall.

In July 1997, Woolworth Corporation announced the closure of its remaining F. W. Woolworth retail stores, including one at the Boulevard Mall. At the time, the store contained  and a restaurant. The store closed later that year. By the end of 1997, the mall had 124 stores and five anchor stores: Dillard's, JCPenney, Macy's, Marshalls, and Sears. Dillard's contained two floors, and was located in the mall's south wing, while the Marshalls store operated in a building separate from the rest of the mall. The mall also had a 13-vendor food court and three restaurants. Dillard's store closed in October 2008, due to the effects of the Great Recession. The closure of Dillard's had a negative impact on several nearby tenants, which closed due to decreased foot traffic in that portion of the mall. GGP purchased the Dillard's store in 2011, for $5 million.

Hispanic and Filipino appeal
By 2011, the mall had seen a resurgence among Hispanic people who lived nearby. The Mexican Patriotic Committee, offering afterschool and parental programs as well as seminars, began operating at the mall in October 2011, in a space that had been vacant for five years. The Hispanic Museum of Nevada opened at the mall in early 2012. The Mexico Vivo Dance Studio and Cultural Arts Center also opened in the mall around the same time, in a  space. Stores at the mall were also now offering Mexican-style candy, piñatas, and quinceañera dresses. Ric Jimenez, the mall's general manager, said at the time:

The addition of Hispanic organizations resulted in an increase of customer attendance at the mall. As of 2012, several Hispanic community organizations were in discussions to start operating inside the mall, whose management planned to lessen its focus on department stores and improve customer attendance by adding community organizations in the mall's vacant store space. Discussions were also underway for non-Hispanic community organizations to open at the mall. Up to that time, the mall had become a popular site for Hispanic events, which included hosting Fiestas Patrias, and a Cinco de Mayo festival, as well as the 2011 season of the reality television series La Academia. The mall became a common gathering place as a community center for the nearby Hispanic and Filipino population.

In 2013, the mall was the location of two large Filipino-related events, celebrating Pinoy pride and the Filipino Independence Day. That year, KMCC, an affiliate channel of the Spanish MundoFox network, announced a deal to relocate to a new  space inside the mall's east court that would include administrative offices and a control room. The channel would also be broadcast to mall shoppers through large television monitors. The channel began operating in July 2013.

Changes under Sansone
Various tenant changes were made following the Sansone purchase. At a cost of more than $2 million, the old Dillard's store was gutted and prepared for several possible tenants before they were decided. A  Goodwill thrift store opened inside the mall in October 2015, occupying part of the first floor of the old Dillard's store. It was the first Goodwill store to open inside an enclosed shopping mall. A  John's Incredible Pizza Company restaurant opened in December 2015, taking up the remainder of Dillard's ground floor. The new pizza restaurant immediately became the chain's most profitable location. An Asian grocery store chain, 99 Ranch Market, also opened at the mall in 2015, occupying a  space formerly used as a Circuit City. The businesses were part of Sansone's plan to add unique mall tenants.

In October 2017, Sears sold its Boulevard Mall store to a Sansone-affiliated investor group, which leased the space back to Sears to keep the store operational. The sale allowed for plans to develop the large parking lot surrounding the store, with various possibilities having been discussed, including a hotel. Sears closed its store in March 2019, as part of a plan to close 80 stores nationwide. In July 2019, Remington Nevada announced plans to redevelop the Sears building and approximately 17 acres of vacant nearby land, at the southeast corner of Maryland Parkway and Desert Inn Road. The retail project would consist of a new shopping center addition which would be located next to the Boulevard Mall. The new center would be known as The Boulevard Plaza, and would include four new standalone stores which would be located alongside Maryland Parkway. New shops would also be built next to the Sears building. Construction was to begin in 2020.

Other tenant changes were made as well in the years following Sansone's purchase. The mall includes El Mercado, a Hispanic-themed marketplace and food court, which was completed in October 2021. It includes nearly 190 stores and operates in the former JCPenney space, following its closure in 2017.

Entertainment
In March 2016, Sansone Companies announced plans to add a  SeaQuest Interactive Aquarium inside the mall. SeaQuest opened on December 11, 2016. It occupies space previously held by nine individual stores in the mall.

Clown 'N Around, an attraction consisting of carnival games and small rides, operated at the Boulevard Mall for nearly 10 years, until the end of 2016.

In March 2017, plans were announced for a then-unnamed  complex containing miniature golf, go-karts, and laser tag. The complex was part of Sansone's continued strategy to add non-traditional tenants in response to retailers' struggle against online shopping alternatives such as Amazon. A shooting occurred at Rex Center in 2018, during an early-morning party, while the rest of the mall had been closed for the night. Four people were injured.

In March 2017, plans were announced for Galaxy Theatres to open a movie theater at the Boulevard Mall under a 35-year lease. The theater would be built in tenant space located across from SeaQuest, which would require relocating some stores. It was intended to be opened around December 2017, in time for the theatrical release of Star Wars: The Last Jedi. The theater, known as Galaxy Theatres Luxury Boulevard, eventually opened in April 2019. It is the third Galaxy Theatres location in the Las Vegas Valley, and features the first Sony Digital Cinema, a large-format theatrical system by Sony.

JCPenney closed its store in the mall on July 31, 2017, after announcing in March that 138 stores would be closing nationwide. In February 2018, plans were announced for Headz Up, a  entertainment complex. It would include a mural room with approximately 60 murals that appear three-dimensional when viewed from a certain angle. Other planned aspects of the complex included a virtual reality attraction, multiple escape rooms, and an area for indoor archery tag, which would be played using rubber arrows. Headz Up opened in June 2018, in the former JCPenney space. A year later, Headz Up added the Nevada Boxing Hall of Fame to its space, including boxing memorabilia and a boxing ring.

Call centers and office space
Call-center operator Sutherland Global Services, based in New York, planned to occupy the entire  second floor of the Dillard's store by summer 2015.

Macy's closed its store in the mall on March 26, 2017. Three months later, the  store was sold for approximately $3.5 million to a company associated with the Troesh family, who partnered with Roland Sansone on his purchase of the mall. Under the deal, Sansone would manage the former Macy's space, while discussions included the possibility of retail on the first floor and an office tenant for the second floor. In February 2018, it was announced that Anthem Blue Cross Blue Shield would open an office on the second floor of the vacant Macy's building. The office would employ approximately 850 people, and was expected to be opened by the end of summer 2018.

In February 2017, plans were announced for a  TeleTech call center to be opened inside the mall. The center was to be built at a cost of $245,000 and would employ approximately 500 people. It opened around March 2017. The new office space would be built at a cost of $800,000, with plans to have it opened in January 2018. Also announced was a second call center, by 24-7 Intouch, a Canadian company which leased  with plans to begin operating in 2018. The mall had three call centers as of March 2019, with an approximate total of 3,000 employees.

References

External links
 

Shopping malls in the Las Vegas Valley
Shopping malls established in 1968
1968 establishments in Nevada
Paradise, Nevada